Agostino Fieschi, C.R. (1643 – 28 May, 1685) was a Roman Catholic prelate who served as Bishop of Accia and Mariana (1683–1685).

Biography
Agostino Fieschi was born in Genoa, Italy in 1643 and ordained a priest in the Congregation of Clerics Regular of the Divine Providence. On 14 June 1683, he was appointed during the papacy of Pope Innocent XI as Bishop of Accia and Mariana. On 20 June 1683, he was consecrated bishop by Alessandro Crescenzi (cardinal), Cardinal-Priest of Santa Prisca, with Pier Antonio Capobianco, Bishop Emeritus of Lacedonia, and Francesco Maria Giannotti, Bishop of Segni, serving as co-consecrators. He served as Bishop of Accia and Mariana until his death on 28 May 1685.

References 

17th-century Roman Catholic bishops in Genoa
Bishops appointed by Pope Innocent XI
1643 births
1685 deaths
Clerics regular
Theatine bishops
Clergy from Genoa
Fieschi family